Kyle Andrew Smith (born June 15, 1969) is an American college basketball coach who is the men's head coach for the Washington State Cougars of the Pac-12 Conference. Prior to joining the Cougars, Smith was the head coach at Columbia University and then at the University of San Francisco. In his final season at Columbia, he led the team to a CIT Championship over UC Irvine. His coaching style has been dubbed “Nerdball”, which is a system that utilizes analytics to track and make decisions on many aspects about the team.

Playing career
Smith was a member of New York's Hamilton College men's basketball team that achieved a 26–1 record his junior season and achieved the national Division III #1 ranking. He also shot 51.3 percent from three-point range, which still stands as a Hamilton single-season record. Additionally, University of Richmond head men's basketball coach Chris Mooney referred to Smith as "the smartest man in college basketball. I think he has the best feel and overview of basketball programs and coaching of anyone I've ever met." Smith has a master's degree in educational leadership from the University of San Diego.

Coaching career
In his first season at Columbia, Smith piloted the Lions to a 15–13 record, becoming the first new Columbia head coach in 33 years to notch a winning season in his inaugural campaign. Smith backed up his offensive reputation with sterling numbers on that side of the ball in year one in Morningside Heights; the Lions scored over 10 points per game more in 2010–11 than they did the year before and scored more than 70 points 15 times during the entire season.

Smith followed up his first season with 15 more wins in 2011–12, becoming the first Columbia basketball coach to record as many as 30 wins in his first two seasons since Lou Rossini in 1952. Under Smith's tutelage, Columbia starting point guard Brian Barbour was voted first team All-Ivy League, the second straight year a Columbia guard was given this honor (Noruwa Agho, 2010–11).

Smith steered Columbia to an RPI of 186 in both 2010–11 and 2011–12, the highest finish in the program's history. Prior to his appointment at Columbia in May 2010, Smith spent 18 seasons as an assistant coach on the NCAA Division I level, including nine seasons (2001–2010) at  Saint Mary's College of California, one season at the Air Force Academy (2000–01) and eight years at the University of San Diego (1992–2000).
 
While at Saint Mary's, he played a role in building the Gaels program into a perennial contender in the West Coast Conference. In his nine seasons with the Gaels, they made three NCAA Tournament (2005, 2008, 2010) appearances and earned one National Invitation Tournament (2009) bid. Saint Mary's averaged 23 wins over his last six seasons on the staff, including an 81–20 record over the last three seasons.

University of San Francisco
Kyle Smith was named as the  head coach of University of San Francisco, on March 30, 2016. Smith led the Dons for three seasons, winning at least 20 games in each season and making two postseason appearances. At the conclusion of the 2018–2019 season, Smith left USF to take the head coaching job at Washington State.

Washington State
On March 27, 2019, Smith was named as the 19th head coach of Washington State, agreeing to a six-year contract worth $1.4 million annually. He was formally introduced at a press conference on April 1, 2019. In his first season at Washington State, Smith led the Cougars to a 6-12 conference record(16-16 overall), their best since 2011-12. In the first round of the Pac-12 tournament, Washington State beat Colorado, their first win in the conference tournament in over 10 years. In September 2021, Smith signed a contract extension through the 2026-27 season. 

During the 2021-22 season, Smith led the Cougars to their first winning record in conference play (11-9) in 14 years (2007-08). The Cougars followed up their regular season success with a win in the Pac-12 tournament before losing to eventual runner-up UCLA. Following that, an NIT berth as a No. 4 seed gave the Cougs their first postseason bout in 11 years. Their first round win against Santa Clara (63-50) notched their first 20-win season since 2010-11.

Head coaching record

References

External links
 San Francisco profile
 Columbia profile

1969 births
Living people
Air Force Falcons men's basketball coaches
American men's basketball coaches
American men's basketball players
Basketball coaches from Texas
Basketball players from Houston
College men's basketball head coaches in the United States
Columbia Lions men's basketball coaches
Hamilton Continentals men's basketball players
Point guards
Saint Mary's Gaels men's basketball coaches
San Diego Toreros men's basketball coaches
San Francisco Dons men's basketball coaches
Sportspeople from Houston
Washington State Cougars men's basketball coaches